Justen Thomas Glad (born February 28, 1997) is an American professional soccer player who plays as a defender for Major League Soccer club Real Salt Lake.

Career

Professional
Born in Pasadena, California, Glad moved with his family to Seattle before finally settling in Tucson, Arizona where he grew up playing soccer. He joined the Real Salt Lake Arizona Academy in 2012. He was part of RSL’s first national championship Academy team, scoring the winning goal in the championship match.  He was then named to the USSDA Western Conference “Starting XI” and was named as an NSCAA High School All-American for the 2012-13 Academy season. On April 7, 2014, Glad signed a homegrown contract with Real Salt Lake, making him the seventh homegrown signing in club history.  He made his professional debut in April 2015 for USL affiliate club Real Monarchs SLC and scored his first goal in a 1–1 draw against Portland Timbers 2. 

Glad made his Major League Soccer debut at the age of 18 with Real Salt Lake in June 2015. Glad became a regular starter with Real Salt Lake in 2016, starting 27 MLS matches, and was named the RSL 2016 defender of the year.

International
Glad was a member of the U.S. under-17 squad that competed in the 2013 CONCACAF U-17 Championship.  He also represented the U.S. in the under-18 level.  On January 8, 2018, Glad received a call-up for the United States men's national soccer team for a friendly against Bosnia and Herzegovina. Glad was named to the final 20-player United States under-23 roster for the 2020 CONCACAF Men's Olympic Qualifying Championship in March 2021. While playing for US Youth National teams, Glad was also was given “Best 11” honors in both the CONCACAF U-20 (2017) and U-23 (2020) tournaments, and he played a major role on the first U-20 team to ever win the CONCACAF championship.

Honors
United States U20
CONCACAF Under-20 Championship: 2017

Individual
CONCACAF U-20 Championship Best XI: 2017

References

External links

 
USSF Development Academy bio

1997 births
Living people
American soccer players
Association football defenders
Major League Soccer players
Real Monarchs players
Real Salt Lake players
Soccer players from Tucson, Arizona
USL Championship players
United States men's under-20 international soccer players
United States men's youth international soccer players
Soccer players from California
Homegrown Players (MLS)
United States men's under-23 international soccer players